The Cuba women's national under-18 and under-19 basketball team is a national basketball team of Cuba, administered by the Federación Cubana de Baloncesto.

It represents the country in international under-18 and under-19 (under age 18 and under age 19) women's basketball competitions.

See also
Cuba women's national basketball team
Cuba women's national under-17 basketball team
Cuba men's national under-19 basketball team

References

External links
 Archived records of Cuba team participations

U-19
Women's national under-19 basketball teams
Basketball